James Elbert "Joe" Greene (October 17, 1911 – July 19, 1989) was an American catcher in Negro league baseball. He played between 1932 and 1948.

Greene served with the 92nd Division in the US Army as an anti-tank gunner between 1943 and 1945, in both Algiers and Italy. When his company entered Milan, they were given the task of removing the bodies of Benito Mussolini and his mistress Clara Petacci, who had been publicly hanged in the Piazzale Loreto on April 29, 1945.

References

External links
 and Baseball-Reference Black Baseball stats and Seamheads
Negro League Baseball Players Association

1911 births
1989 deaths
Atlanta Black Crackers players
Homestead Grays players
Kansas City Monarchs players
Cleveland Buckeyes players
People from Stone Mountain, Georgia
Sportspeople from DeKalb County, Georgia
United States Army personnel of World War II
United States Army soldiers
20th-century African-American sportspeople